The Oriental beetle (Anomala orientalis, often given as Exomala orientalis under an invalid genus name) is a species of shining leaf chafer in the family Scarabaeidae. It is a beetle about 0.7 - 1.1 cm (0.3 - 0.4 inches) long, with mottled, metallic brown- and black-colored elytra and a similarly colored thorax and head during the adult stage. It is sometimes confused with the larger and more colorful Japanese beetle. During the larval stage, the Oriental beetle can be identified by the parallel line raster pattern.

This species is native to Asia. It was introduced to North America and has since spread to, and become a pest in, several mid-Atlantic states. Its invasive range extends from Maine to South Carolina and Wisconsin. In its larval stage, the grub feeds on the roots of grasses, while the adults feed on various plants. Sex pheromone traps are often used to capture and kill the Oriental beetle.

References

External links
Bugguide.net species profile

Rutelinae
Beetles described in 1875